Ryd is a locality situated in Tingsryd Municipality, Kronoberg County, Sweden with 1,415 inhabitants in 2010.

Notable people 

 Malou Prytz

References 

Populated places in Kronoberg County
Populated places in Tingsryd Municipality